Aluízio Freire Ramos Accioly Neto (27 September 1912 – 17 July 1956), commonly known as Baiano, was a Brazilian basketball player. He competed in the men's tournament at the 1936 Summer Olympics.

References

1912 births
1956 deaths
Brazilian men's basketball players
Olympic basketball players of Brazil
Basketball players at the 1936 Summer Olympics
Basketball players from Rio de Janeiro (city)